Tower 185 is a 55-storey,  skyscraper in the Gallus district of Frankfurt, Germany. It is the 4th tallest building in Frankfurt and the 4th tallest in Germany, tied with Main Tower. The anchor tenant of the tower is the German branch office of PricewaterhouseCoopers, which has leased .

The tower was initially planned to be  with 50 stories; however, when plans changed to increase the height by an additional five floors, its name was not changed.

Skyscrapers in Frankfurt

See also
 List of tallest buildings in Frankfurt
 List of tallest buildings in Germany
 List of tallest buildings in the European Union
 List of tallest buildings in Europe

References

External links
 Official website

Office buildings completed in 2011
Skyscrapers in Frankfurt
Skyscraper office buildings in Germany